Died 11 December 2020
Alain le Pichon (born 29 November 1944) is a French Anthropologist.

With Umberto Eco he founded Transcultura, an international institute, of which he became the president. In October 2010, Transcultura was given the role of organising th EU-China High Level Cultural Forum.

Works
In French :
 Le Renversement du Ciel, collective work directed by Alain le Pichon and Moussa Sow, preface and texts by Umberto Eco, Paris CNRS Editions 2011 (650 p)
 Connaissance et Réciprocité, collective work directed by Alain le Pichon, preface by Umberto Eco, Presses Universitaires de Louvain, 1988 (285p.)
 Le Troupeau des Songes, avec Souleymane Baldé, Editions de la Maison des Sciences de l'Homme, 357 p. Paris 1990
 Le Regard inégal, essai, Editions JC Lattès, 230 p. Paris 1992
 La Licorne et le Dragon, les malentendus dans la recherche de l'universel, avec Yue Dayun, presses de l'université de Pékin 1995 - nouvelle édition en français revue Presses Universitaires de Pékin/Editions de la Fondation Charles Meyer 2004
 Les Assises de la connaissance réciproque, ed. Le Robert, 2003 (collective work directed by A. le Pichon)

en italien :
 Sguardi venuti da lontano, with a preface by  Umberto Eco, Editions Bompiani, Milan, 1992

In English :
 Strategy for a mutual Knowledge Presses, Actes du Colloque Transcultura, University of Chicago Press 1992
In Chinese :
 Stratégies pour une connaissance réciproque, avec le Professeur Wang Bin, presses de l'université Sun Yat Sen de Canton
 La Licorne et le Dragon, (édition en chinois, avec le Professeur Yue Dayun, University of Peking Press1995

Co director with Yue Dayun of the journal Dialogue Transculturel

References

French anthropologists
Living people
1944 births